Come Down, Someone Wants You (French: Descendez, on vous demande) is a 1951 French comedy film directed by Jean Laviron and starring Noëlle Norman, Daniel Clérice and Paulette Dubost. It is based on the 1946 play of the same name by Jean de Letraz.

The film's sets were designed by the art director Rino Mondellini.

Cast
 Noëlle Norman as Sylvette de Vignolles
 Daniel Clérice as Francis Ardelles
 Paulette Dubost as Irène
 Jean Tissier as Léonard de Vignolles
 Jacques Dynam as 	Gilbert
 Jean-Jacques as Charley 
 Christiane Sertilange as Loulou 
 Pauline Carton as Ursule, la bonne
 Grillon as Le camionneur

References

Bibliography 
 Goble, Alan. The Complete Index to Literary Sources in Film. Walter de Gruyter, 1999.
 Marie, Michel. The French New Wave: An Artistic School. John Wiley & Sons, 2008.

External links 
 

1951 films
1951 comedy films
French comedy films
1950s French-language films
Films directed by Jean Laviron
French films based on plays
1950s French films